Vrbičany is a municipality and village in Litoměřice District in the Ústí nad Labem Region of the Czech Republic. It has about 300 inhabitants.

History
The first written mention of Vrbičany is from 1225.

References

Villages in Litoměřice District